Limanowa  (Liminuv) is a small town in southern Poland, in the Lesser Poland Voivodeship. It is the capital of Limanowa County and had a population of 15,132 in 2012.

History

Mentions of the town date back to 1496, when it was documented as Ilmanowa, a rural estate that belonged to members of the szlachta. In 1520, ownership of the estate was passed from the Słupski family to Achacy Jordan, who subsequently established a judiciary.

Limanowa became a township in 1565, after being granted city rights by King Sigismund II Augustus. The residents were not required to pay taxes to the Crown for a period of thirty years, throughout which the town rapidly developed. However, its economic strength declined due to the plague, and destruction caused by the Swedish invasion of 1655.

While the town was constantly damaged by fire because of its wooden buildings, much of its infrastructure was destroyed by the fire of 1759. It was not until the Polish Partitions, and Limanowa's incorporation into the Austrian province of Galicia, that it was rebuilt. The town began to flourish as a trading hub, hosting over eighteen markets per year.

During World War I, Limanowa was located at the Eastern Front. In the early months of the war, it was the site of the Battle of Limanowa between December 1 and December 9, 1914 in which the Austro-Hungarian Army repelled a Russian breakthrough southwestwards between Limanowa and Kraków.

The Second World War saw invasion by German soldiers, and the establishment of a ghetto in Limanowa. The town suffered heavy casualties as a result of the occupation; 472 people were shot as hostages and conspiracy participants, 123 as concentration camp prisoners, 91 people died in the Third Reich, 47 died fighting in the war, and 3,053 people from Limanowa's Jewish population were murdered, including the family of Senator Bernie Sanders.

Sports
 Limanovia Limanowa, a football team playing in local league.
 Limblach Limanowa, a basketball team reaching top Polish leagues.
 Limanowa is also home to one of the most extreme mountain marathons in Europe, so-called "Kierat" which attracts hundreds of people every year.

People
 Zygmunt Berling (1896–1980), general, politician
 Teresa Dzielska (pl) (born 1977), actress
 Dorota Gawryluk (pl) (born 1972), journalist and TV presenter
 Jakub Kot (born 1990), ski jumper
 Maciej Kot (born 1991), ski jumper
 Justyna Kowalczyk (born 1983), cross-country skier and multiple Olympic medallist
 Katarzyna Niewiadoma (born 1994), cyclist
 Katarzyna Zielińska (pl) (born 1979), actress

International relations

Twin towns — Sister cities

Limanowa is twinned with:
  Niles, United States
  Truskavets, Ukraine
  Dolný Kubín, Slovakia

References

External links
 Job market in Limanowa on GoWork.pl: https://www.gowork.pl/poradnik/25/kariera/praca-limanowa-gdzie-szukac-pracy-po-studiach-w-limanowej/ 
 
 http://www.limanowa.in
 https://web.archive.org/web/20160326205106/http://www.ilmanowa.republika.pl/
 http://www.limanowa.eu
 https://web.archive.org/web/20120206103821/http://www.limanowa.tv/
 http://www.limanowa.com.pl/
 Jewish Community in Limanowa on Virtual Shtetl
 https://web.archive.org/web/20120222210256/http://www.poland.travel/en-us/regions/the-maloposkie-voivodship-not-only-puff-pastries-with-cream/

Limanowa County
Cities and towns in Lesser Poland Voivodeship
Kraków Voivodeship (1919–1939)
Shtetls
Holocaust locations in Poland
Nazi war crimes in Poland